The Guiana Shield is one of the three cratons of the South American Plate. It is a 1.7 billion-year-old Precambrian geological formation in northeast South America that forms a portion of the northern coast. The higher elevations on the shield are called the Guiana Highlands, which is where the table-like mountains called tepuis are found. The Guiana Highlands are also the source of some of the world's most well-known waterfalls such as Angel Falls, Kaieteur Falls and Cuquenan Falls.

The Guiana Shield underlies Guyana (previously British Guiana), Suriname (previously Dutch Guiana) and French Guiana (or Guyane), much of southern Venezuela, as well as parts of Colombia and Brazil. The rocks of the Guiana Shield consist of metasediments and metavolcanics (greenstones) overlain by sub-horizontal layers of sandstones, quartzites, shales and conglomerates intruded by sills of younger mafic intrusives such as gabbros.

Geology
The oldest rocks in the shield consist of Archean Imataca Complex, composed of a quartz-feldspar gneiss and subordinate mafic gneiss.  The Guri Fault marks the southern boundary of the complex.  South of that fault are Early Proterozoic rocks consisting of the metavolcanic Pastora Supergroup and the granitic plutonic Supamo Complex.  The Cuchivero Group consists of ash flow tuff and granitic plutonic rocks.  The Early to Middle Proterozoic Roraima Group consists of continental clastic sedimentary rocks.  These Precambrian sediments include quartz sandstones, quartzites, and conglomerates presumed to be 1.8 to 1.4 Ga in age.

Geomorphology
There are three upland areas of the Guiana Shield:
 The Guiana Highlands proper are in Venezuela east of the Orinoco and extend across much of west-central Guyana and into the northern Roraima state in Brazil.
 The Tumucumaque Uplands which are a series of central massifs in an arc from the Wilhelmina Mountains of south-central Suriname, along the southern boundary of Suriname and Guyana, forming the Acarai Mountains of Roraima state and the Tumuc-Humac Mountains of Pará and Amapá states of Brazil. From this arc, the southern uplands slope gently downwards towards the Amazon River and the northern uplands slope gently downwards toward the Atlantic.
 The Chiribiquete Plateau is a sandstone topped plateau with an elevation of  that forms the western edge of the shield. The plateau is separated from the eastern Andes by the thick Neogene sediments of the Sub-Andean Trough that runs along the northern and western rim of the Guiana Shield.

The north-central part of the Guiana Highlands is dominated by high flat-topped peaks called tepuis, of the Roraima supergroup and Quasi-Roraima formation, and the rounded granite peaks of the Parguaza and Imataca complexes to the north and southwestern edges of the area. Pico da Neblina is the highest summit of the larger Neblina massif, a highly eroded sandstone plateau that straddles the Venezuela-Brazil border and that has lost the typical tabletop shape of the other tepuis in the region.

Ecology

The Guiana Shield is one of the regions of highest biodiversity in the world, and has many endemic species. The region houses over 3000 vertebrate species: 1168 fresh water fish, 269 amphibians (54% endemics), 295 reptiles (29%), 1004 birds (7.7%), and 282 mammals (11%). Diversity of invertebrates remains largely undocumented, but there are several species of endemic butterflies and dung beetles.

Plant life is equally rich and 13,367 species of vascular plants have been found, approximately 40% of which is considered endemic. The shield is overlain by the largest expanse of tropical forest on any Precambrian shield area in the world. Guianan rain forest is similar in nature to Amazonian rain forest and known protected areas include the Iwokrama Forest of central Guyana, Kaieteur, Kanuku National Park of southern Guyana, the UNESCO World Heritage Site Central Suriname Nature Reserve of Suriname, the Guiana Amazonian Park in French Guiana and the Tumucumaque National Park in the Amapá State of Brazil. In Venezuela the forests are protected by Canaima, Parima-Tapirapeco and Serranía de la Neblina national parks. In 2014, the Government of Colombia designated a 250 hectare area of the Guiana Shield, as a Ramsar Wetland, thus becoming a protected area of international importance in accordance to the Ramsar Convention.

According to recent researches, although ecosystems of the Guayana Highlands remain vibrant, emerging issues (including "a well-known invasive plant elsewhere" Poa annua and "one of the most aggressive weeds" Polypogon elongatus) and infectious faecal bacteria Helicobacter pylori have been documented.

See also

References

External links 
 
 
 

Cratons
.
Shield
Plateaus of South America
Plateaus of Brazil
Plateaus of Venezuela
Geographical regions of Venezuela
Geography of Colombia
Geography of French Guiana
Geography of Guyana
Geography of Suriname
Natural regions of South America
Geology of South America
Geology of Brazil
Geology of Colombia
Geology of French Guiana
Geology of Guyana
Geology of Suriname
Geology of Venezuela
.
Natural history of South America
North Region, Brazil
Geography of Amapá
Geography of Pará
Geography of Roraima
Precambrian South America